Columbia Center for Theatrical Arts (CCTA) is a Greater Washington D.C. Area regional theater school based in Columbia, Maryland. CCTA is a non-profit 501(c)(3) organization that is funded, in part, by the National Endowment for the Arts, the Maryland State Arts Council, and the Howard County Arts Council from Howard County, Maryland.

History
Founded in 1972, as the Columbia School for Theatrical Arts (now Columbia Center for Theatrical Arts) it is known for its productions of musicals and new plays. CCTA was founded by Toby Orenstein. She was asked by businessman and builder James Rouse to create a non-profit theatrical arts school for the then-new Maryland city of Columbia. Its mission is to educate through the arts. CCTA has three distinct departments:  it offers a conservatory, theatrical arts productions, and outreach programs.

Theatre Programs

Conservatory 
The conservatory offers performing arts-based programs to the local community. These include different programs for children in primary and secondary school. The Young Columbians are a performing troupe created by CCTA. The conservatory has been the recipient of five grants from the National Endowment for the Arts.

Outreach Programs 

The CCTA has a number of incentives such as fundraising, scholarships. The Labor of Love is an annual event that raises money for the AIDS Alliance of Howard County. Another project was the Labels Project in 1992 which was formed to educate young people on how to combat bias and prejudice by supporting individuality, celebrating diversity and teaching adolescents tactics for resisting peer pressure.

CCTA's Outreach Programs are aimed to help make theatre arts available and accessible to local students in need. Partnerships now exist with Baltimore City Public School System and the Loyola University Maryland. CCTA performs the original play Ben Carson, M.D. to local youth. CCTA has a program for students with special needs at Glenelg High School, under the direction of Kassidy Sharp, and the Kennedy Krieger Institute of Baltimore.

Recent productions 
Past productions include the 2016 world premiere of Magic Under Glass, the musical, based on Jaclyn Dolamore's book. Performance venues include the White House, Wolf Trap, Walt Disney World, The John F. Kennedy Center for the Performing Arts, Merriweather Post Pavilion, The Fillmore, Lake Kittamaqundi, Howard Community College, Toby's Dinner Theatre, The Ellipse, House of the Temple, the Washington D.C. Temple, and others.

Board of Directors

 President: Toby Orenstein 
 Chairman: Janet Davidson Gordon 
 Vice chairman: Carolyn Kelemen 
 Secretary: Mindy Hirsch 
 Treasurer: Harold Orenstein 
 Members: Mary Armiger, John Astin, Steve Duffy, John Harding, Sarah Otchet, Melissa Rosenberg, and Jack Wilen 
 Honorary Board Member: Edward Norton

People

 Robin Baxter, Broadway performer
 Risa Binder, Emmy-nominated country singer-songwriter
 Steve Blanchard, Broadway performer
 Caroline Bowman, Broadway performer 
 Johnny Holliday, Radio and TV sportscaster and a former Top 40 radio disc jockey
 Mary Page Keller, Hollywood film actress 
 Megan Lawrence, Tony-nominated broadway performer
 Edward Norton, Academy Award-nominated actor, filmmaker, and activist
 Ric Ryder, Broadway performer and vocal coach
 Peter Salett, musician, composer, performer, and singer-songwriter
 Margo Seibert, Broadway performer
 Tracie Thoms, television, film, and stage actress and singer
 Betsy True, Broadway performer
 Mark Waldrop, Broadway writer and director
 Tico Wells, Hollywood film actor
 Brynn Williams, Broadway performer
 Stacy Wolf, Author and musical theatre director and professor

Awards
 2014 Accessibility Leadership Award, Howard County Commission on Disability Issues
 2015 Family Friendly Business Award, Howard County Department of Citizen's Services
 2016 Friends of Education Award, Howard County Public Schools
 2016 Cherry Adler Award, The Maryland State Arts Council, Maryland Department of Commerce

Community Partners 
 Baltimore City Public School System
 Howard County Public School System
 Howard County Recreation and Parks
 Kennedy Krieger Institute
 Howard County Arts Council 
 Howard Community College
 Howard County General Hospital: A member of Johns Hopkins Medicine

See also

 Toby's Dinner Theatre
 Young Columbians
 Helen Hayes Award
 Theater in Washington, D.C.
 Greater Baltimore Theater Awards

References

External links
 

Columbia, Maryland
Theatres in Maryland
Non-profit organizations based in Maryland
Tourist attractions in Howard County, Maryland
Event venues established in 1972
Howard County, Maryland
1972 establishments in Maryland
Regional theatre in the United States
Theatre companies in Maryland
Theatres completed in 1972
Performing arts centers in Maryland
Performing arts in Maryland
Arts centers in Maryland
501(c)(3) organizations